"Candidatus Bartonella woyliei" is a candidatus bacteria from the genus of Bartonella which was isolated from the fleas Pygiopsylla hilli and Ixodes australiensis.

References

Bartonellaceae
Bacteria described in 2011
Candidatus taxa